Fair Albion - Visions of England, is a 2009 album on the Signum Classics label featuring compositions by Patrick Hawes.  The music ‘celebrates the heart and soul of the British Landscape’.  The CD includes performances by Elin Manahan Thomas (soprano), the cellist Julian Lloyd Webber and the Royal Harpist Claire Jones.

Track listing
 The Call, Elin Manahan Thomas (soprano), The Raven Quartet
 Reflexionem, Julian Lloyd Webber (cello) & Claire Jones (harp)
 Ascension, Raven Quartet
 Fair Albion, Prague Symphony Orchestra
 A Birthday, Elin Manahan Thomas (soprano) & Claire Jones (harp)
 Ranworth Three Broadland Preludes Patrick Hawes (piano)
 Fenside Three Broadland Preludes Patrick Hawes (piano)
 Remembrance Three Broadland Preludes Patrick Hawes (piano)
 Requiem Aeternam from the Lazarus Requiem, Brno Chamber Orchestra and Chamber Choir
 Gloriette, Julian Lloyd Webber (cello) & Patrick Hawes (piano)
 How Hill, Claire Jones (harp)
 Cantate Domino, Christian Forshaw, The Sanctuary Ensemble
 After the Rain, Patrick Hawes (piano), Duke Quartet
 The Darkling Thrush, David Stout (baritone) & Patrick Hawes (piano)
 Quanta Qualia, Brno Chamber Orchestra

External links 

 Patrick Hawes
 

2009 albums